Orvepitant (GW823296) is a drug developed by GlaxoSmithKline which acts as a selective antagonist for the NK1 receptor. It was under development as a potential antidepressant drug, and early stage human clinical trials showed it to have some antidepressant effects, though not with sufficient efficacy to justify further development for this application. It was however considered a successful proof of concept for NK1 antagonists as potential antidepressants, and efforts are continuing to find more potent compounds which might be more effective.

References 

NK1 receptor antagonists
Trifluoromethyl compounds
Fluoroarenes